The Harsen prize was an academic prize, accompanied by a cash award, that was given to deserving graduating students of the Columbia University College of Physicians and Surgeons in New York City during the 19th century and early 20th century.  There were different categories of the prize including "Clinical Reports" and "Proficiency in Examination". There were multiple placings or levels of the prize; in 1884 first prize under "Proficiency in Examination" was accompanied by an award of US$500, second place received US$300, and third place received US$200.

Recipients
George Frederick Shrady, Sr. 1861
Allan McLane Hamilton 1870
Charles Henry May, 1st prize Clinical Reports, 1st prize Proficiency in Examination 1883
George Sumner Huntington, 1st prize Clinical Reports, 1st prize Proficiency in Examination 1884
L. S. Manson, 2nd prize Clinical Reports 1884
G. W. Weld, 3rd prize Clinical Reports 1884
George Roe Lockwood, Jr., 2nd prize Proficiency in Examination 1884
E. K. Morton, 3rd prize Proficiency in Examination 1884
Ervin Alden Tucker for Proficiency in All Branches of Medical Teaching 1885 
William Gilman Thompson for an essay 1885
Edward Wight Clarke 1887
Levi Olmstead Wiggins circa 1889
Austin Wilkinson Hollis 1890
Alexis Moschcowitz 1891
William Van Valzah Hayes 1893
Albert Ashton Berg in Clinical Reports 1894
Archibald Henry Busby, 1st prize  Clinical Reports 1898
Edward A. Rosenberg, 2nd prize Clinical Reports 1898
R. J. Held, 3rd prize Clinical Reports 1898
Victor C. Peterson, 1st prize Proficiency in Examination 1898
Philip Schieffelin Sabine, 2nd prize Proficiency in Examination 1898
Hughes Dayton, 3rd prize Proficiency in Examination 1898
William W. Vibbert, honors in Proficiency in Examination 1898
George A. Saxe, honors in Proficiency in Examination 1898
John M. Taylor, honors in Proficiency in Examination 1898
Emil A. Rundquist, honors in Proficiency in Examination 1898
Charles M. Williams, honors in Proficiency in Examination 1898
Burton J. Lee, honors in Proficiency in Examination 1898
Stanley O. Sabel, honors in Proficiency in Examination 1898
Haven Emerson, 1901
William T. Bull, 1902

References 

Awards and prizes of Columbia University
Student awards
Awards by university and college in the United States